Daniel Noriega Acosta (born 30 March 1977 in Puerto Ordaz) is a retired Venezuelan football striker who made a total number of 38 appearances (five goals) for the Venezuela national team between 1996 and 2005.

Club career
He started his professional career at Minervén in 1995. Noriega also played in Peru, Argentina, Colombia and Spain.

References

External links

 Argentine Primera statistics

1977 births
Living people
People from Ciudad Guayana
Venezuelan footballers
Venezuela international footballers
Association football forwards
1999 Copa América players
2001 Copa América players
2004 Copa América players
Segunda División players
Argentine Primera División players
Peruvian Primera División players
Categoría Primera A players
Minervén S.C. players
Rayo Vallecano players
Unión de Santa Fe footballers
Sporting Cristal footballers
A.C.C.D. Mineros de Guayana players
Deportivo Italia players
Independiente Medellín footballers
Deportivo Táchira F.C. players
Caracas FC players
Monagas S.C. players
Llaneros de Guanare players
Venezuelan expatriate footballers
Expatriate footballers in Argentina
Expatriate footballers in Peru
Expatriate footballers in Spain
Expatriate footballers in Colombia
Venezuelan expatriate sportspeople in Argentina
Venezuelan expatriate sportspeople in Colombia
Venezuelan expatriate sportspeople in Peru
Venezuelan expatriate sportspeople in Spain
Guaros F.C. players